Dr. Sunder Ramaswamy is an international development economist, an educator, and a higher education administrator with extensive experience in U.S and India. He joined the Middlebury College, Vermont in 1990 as a member of the economics department and in (2021-present)  become a distinguished College Professor of International Economics at Middlebury College, Vermont.  

From 2009-2015, he served as the President of the Monterey Institute of International Studies (now the Middlebury Institute of International Studies at Monterey). From 2017-2021 he served as the Inaugural Vice Chancellor of Krea University. He also currently serves as the Chairman of The Asia Foundation, San Francisco.  

As aforementioned, from 2017 - 2021, he was the Inaugural Vice Chancellor of Krea University, a new innovative approach to interwoven learning designed specifically to help students prepare for impactful leadership in a dynamic, uncertain, and complex world of the 21st century. He worked in collaboration with leading academics, industrialists, and philanthropists to set up the university in Sri City, near Chennai, India.  Launched in 2018 by the Vice President of India, Krea University is home to the new and innovative School of Interwoven Arts and Sciences (SIAS), the IFMR Graduate School of Business, and 5 cutting edge research centers -- Leveraging Evidence for Access and Development (LEAD), Centre for Digital Financial Inclusion (CDFI), Initiatives for What Works for Women and Girls in the Economy (IWWAGE), Inclusion Economics (partnering with Yale), and Abdul Latif Jameel Poverty Action Lab – South Asia (JPAL at MIT). As the Inaugural Vice Chancellor, Ramaswamy has, since 2017, actively worked on and overseen the launch of the new university in all its facets – admissions, outreach, communications, curriculum design, hiring of faculty, facilities improvements, fundraising and managing of governance structures; in addition to this, he has ensured the integration of the IFMR Graduate School of Business and Research Centers that were inherited as part of the activities of the sponsoring body of Krea, IFMR Society (founded 1970).   

Further, he serves as the Chairman and Member of the Executive Committee of The Asia Foundation, San Francisco. Prior Board service includes Vice Chair & Member of Executive Committee of the Board of Directors, American International School of Chennai (2016 - 2020),, Co-Chair, Higher Education Research Cluster (Monterey County, California, 2012-2014), Vice Chair of the Board of Trustees of the International School of Monterey (a K-8 Public Charter International Baccalaureate School in Seaside, California, 2009 - 2015), the Vienna Center for Disarmament and Non-Proliferation (2011-2015), and an ex-officio member of the Board of Trustees of the Monterey Institute of International Studies, A Graduate School of Middlebury College (Monterey, California, 2009 – 2015).

Dr. Ramaswamy's full history, achievements and publications can be found in more detail at his website: https://www.sunderramaswamy.com/

Education

Dr. Sunder Ramaswamy received his bachelor's degree in Economics (Honors) from St. Stephen’s College, University of Delhi, India. He was ranked 1st in Part III Economics & 4th in the overall University examination (1981-1984). He was awarded a Merit Scholarship by the Central Board of Secondary Education, India, for securing 5th rank in the Senior Secondary School Examinations, 1981.

Dr. Ramaswamy received his Ph.D. in Economics from Purdue University, M.A. in Economics from the Delhi School of Economics and M.S from Purdue University(U.S.A).

Career
For around 31 years, Dr. Ramaswamy has held various positions in various organizations.

At Monterey Institute of International Studies (MIIS), a Graduate School of Middlebury College:
(note – this became the Middlebury Institute of International Studies at Monterey in 2015)

He served as President & Frederick C. Dirks Professor of International Economics (2009-2015). At the Monterey Institute of International Studies, he oversaw an ambitious academic reorganization, a successful completion of the merger of MIIS with Middlebury College (30 June 2010), handover of the re-accreditation process from Western Association of Schools and Colleges (WASC)to the New England Association of Schools and Colleges  (NEASC; including a successful 10 year combined NEASC re-accreditation in 2011-12), accelerated fund raising, scaling up of the endowment, and increased Institutional visibility.

During his tenure, the Institute successfully launched new graduate degree programs in nonproliferation and terrorism studies (NPTS), international education management (IEM), international trade and economic diplomacy (ITED), as well as the creation of three new research centres (the Centre for Blue Economy, the Centre for Conflict Studies, and the Center for Social Impact Learning), a Cyber Security initiative, and a number of other innovative programs. One of the programs he supported, the Frontier Market Scouts in 2011, received an Ashoka –Cordes Innovation award in 2013 as one of 6 innovative university programs in social entrepreneurship that year. He also re-energized the alumni outreach programs, resurrected the Reunion program, created new awards for outstanding alumni, and promoted active community engagement with the creation of the eMIISsaries group of ambassadors. The Institute also completed an ambitious facilities’ Master Plan to develop the Campus over the next decade.

At Middlebury College, where he has been based since 1990, he was appointed the Frederick C. Dirks Distinguished Professor of International Economics in 2002.  At Middlebury, he also served as the Vice Provost of the Middlebury – Monterey Integration Task Force (2007-2008), Dean for Faculty Development and Research, (2007 – 2008); Acting Dean of the Faculty (2006–07), the Chair of the economics department for three terms (1996 – 2003). At Middlebury College, he was also elected to every major College wide committee by his peers.

At Madras School of Economics, one of India’s Premier higher education institutes for economics:

He was the Officiating Director and Visiting Distinguished Professor (2015-2017); he also served as Member Secretary for Center of Excellence in Environmental Economics, funded by the National Ministry of Environment, Forests and Climate Change. He was the Director and Professor of Economics (2004-2005), Visiting Associate Professor (2000-2001) and Visiting Professor (2003).

At Vanderbilt University: Served as Visiting Assistant Professor of Economics (1995).

At Purdue University:  Was Visiting Scholar, Department of Agricultural Economics ( Summers, 1991–92).

Consultancy/Grants

He has been a consultant to UNCTAD, UNIDO, United Nations University, World Bank on specific development economics projects. He has received grants from the S.W. Davis Foundation Ford Foundation, Kellogg Foundation, USAID to support his academic work,

Awards

Recognized by the International School of Monterey as a "Distinguished Honoree"  for National Philanthropy day, Monterey Peninsula, California, USA, November, 2014

Anonymous Donor endows a 7 figure gift to create the "Sunder and Varna Ramaswamy Scholarship Fund"  at the Middlebury Institute of International Studies at Monterey, May, 2014.

Monterey County Weekly:  "25 Who Got Us Here" – part of a profile of "25 game changing local leaders" on the Monterey peninsula; as part of the 25th anniversary of the Weekly; 31 October 2013;

Recipient of the Monterey County Business Council 2011 Economic Vitality Award  in the "Education" category, Monterey, California, USA, February 2011.

Nominated by the student body for the Marjorie Lamberti Faculty Appreciation Award for "Excellence in Teaching", Middlebury College, Middlebury, Vermont, USA, April, 2006.

Recipient of the Marjorie E. Lamberti Faculty Appreciation Award   for "Excellence in Teaching". Awarded by the Student Government Association, Middlebury College, Middlebury, Vermont, USA, April 2003.

Honeywell Award for Outstanding Graduate Instructor for 2 years, 1988 and 1989; Krannert Graduate School of Management, Purdue University, West Lafayette, Indiana, USA.

In 2020, Education World (the largest trade publication in India) featured him and Krea University as part of their Cover story.  

In 2019, the Indian Economic Development & Research Association (IEDRA) conferred him with an “Outstanding Achievement Award for Educational Excellence” and in the same year, Careers 360, in marking its 10th Anniversary Edition featured him as one of the “top Academic Changemakers in India”.

Books

"Development and Democracy: New Perspectives on an Old Debate" (Editors: Sunder Ramaswamy and Jeffrey W. Cason), University Press of New England, Hanover, New Hampshire, 2003, 306 pp.

"Social Capital and Economic Development: Well-Being in Developing Countries" (Editors: Jonathan Isham, Thomas Kelly, and Sunder Ramaswamy), Edward Elgar Publishers, Cheltenham, U.K., 2002, 264 pp.

One of three editors of "The Middlebury Bicentennial Series in International Studies" (Editors: Michael Geisler, Sunder Ramaswamy, and Neil Waters) -- a collection of volumes with University Press of New England Press, 1999-2003.

"The Economics of Agricultural Technology in Semi-Arid Sub-Saharan Africa" (with John H. Sanders and Barry I. Shapiro), Johns Hopkins University Press, Baltimore, Maryland, 1996, 1997, 330 pp; Second Printing, 1997. Research for the project supported by funding from USAID. 
	
"Economics: An Honors Companion" (with Kailash Khandke, Jenifer Gamber, and David Colander), Maxi Press/Richard D. Irwin Publishers, Chicago, Illinois, USA, 1995, 290 pp.

His research interests are in the areas of development economics (focus on sustainable development, technological change, and financial sector reforms), international economics (trade liberalization, trade and development issues), and applied microeconomics. He has contributed many chapters in various books and articles either published or forthcoming in journals such as Agricultural Economics, Agricultural Systems, Applied Economics, Comparative Economic Studies, Economic Development and Cultural Change, Economics Letters, Environment, Food and Nutrition Bulletin, "Foreign Trade Review" and Outlook on Agriculture.   
	
He has presented his research at international conferences in Austria, Canada, China, Egypt, Greece, Italy, Netherlands, Singapore, Spain, Taiwan, Turkey, and Zimbabwe. He has also given talks in over 150 invited seminars, and conference/workshop settings in India and USA on subjects ranging from globalization, to economic development, to Indian economic reforms, to economics literacy. Articles featuring him and/or his views on various economics topics have appeared in the popular media (International and Indian) such as, Access Monterey Peninsula (AMP Media), The Addison Independent, Asia Times Online, The Californian, China Central TV, The Deccan Chronicle, The Diplomatist, The Economic Times, Education World, The Hindu, Hindu Business Line, India Abroad, Indian Express, India Today, India West,Industrial Economist, The Monterey Herald, The Monterey County Weekly, The New Indian Express, Rediff.com, SIFY.com, Time (Asia & Europe editions), and Vermont Public Radio.

Business Standard - Seeking global solutions through liberal arts, Financial Express - Young minds must be exposed to both arts and sciences, Hindustan Times - A well-conceptualised liberal arts and sciences programme is the need of the hour, HIGHER EDUCATION plus, BUSINESS WORLD EDUCATION - Value Of Soft Skills In The Labour Market.

Krea University’s Vice Chancellor Dr. Sunder Ramaswamy Speaks about 'Krea University' programs, Thinking of studying liberal arts? The discipline has come of age in India, Times of India : Over 200 apply for Krea univ in 10 days, The Hindu - Krea university partners with Dalai Lama centre, Vice-President of India launches Krea University, Founding batch to have 125 students, have received good response so far: Krea University VC, Deccan Herald - Making Cases for Liberal Arts.

References

Scholars from Chennai
Living people
The Asia Foundation
Year of birth missing (living people)